That's GBA is an English-language magazine published in Guangzhou and  Shenzhen in the Greater Bay Area, Southern China.

It was created in 1997 under the name Clueless in Guangzhou, that's PRD. PRD stands for "Pearl River Delta". In January 2020, the magazine said goodbye to the That’s PRD moniker (which they’d published under for the past 13 years) and adopted the name That’s GBA to reflect their local coverage and the political and societal changes that have occurred in the region.

That's magazines, including thats GBA sister publications That’s Shanghai and That’s Beijing are now the biggest English magazines in Guangzhou, Shanghai, Beijing, and Shenzhen.

References

External links
 Magazine website
 Magazine website

1997 establishments in China
Magazines established in 1997
Magazines published in China
Mass media in Guangzhou
Mass media in Shenzhen
English-language magazines